Albert George Savage (1888 – after 1911) was an English footballer who played for Stoke.

Career
Savage was born in Warwick and played amateur football with Nuneaton Town before joining Stoke in 1910. At Stoke he scored four goals in nine matches during the 1910–11 season before returning to amateur football with Bulkington.

Career statistics

References

1888 births
Year of death missing
People from Warwick
English footballers
Association football forwards
Nuneaton Borough F.C. players
Stoke City F.C. players
Footballers from Warwickshire